GKN is a British engineering firm.

GKN or gkn may also refer to:

 Gokana language (ISO 639-3 code)
 Gulkana Airport (IATA airport code), Alaska, US
 Reformed Churches in the Netherlands